Baker College is a private college with its main campus in Owosso, Michigan. It was founded in 1911 and has additional campuses throughout the Lower Peninsula of Michigan.

The college has been accused of predatory practices. In 2022, a ProPublica and Detroit Free Press investigation titled "The Nonprofit College That Spends More on Marketing Than Financial Aid" highlighted its low graduation rate and high student debt rate compared to comparable institutions, as well as its unconventional management structure. That month, Baker College threatened legal action against a former faculty member relating to a non-disparagement clause included in a settlement with Baker.

History

Baker College started as Baker Business University, which was founded in Flint, Michigan, in 1911, by Eldon E. Baker. In 1965 it merged with Muskegon College when representatives of the Jewell family, who owned and managed  Muskegon College, bought Baker Business University.  The university changed its name to Baker Junior College in 1974 and became a non profit corporation in 1977.

2008 - A closed auto dealership in Flint, Michigan is renovated and transformed into the Baker College Center for Transportation technology, opening to students in 2009.
2009 - Baker College's Culinary Institute of Michigan (CIM) opens to students interested in studying culinary arts, baking and pastry arts, and food and beverage management. The 3-story,  facility in downtown Muskegon, Michigan began construction in the spring of 2008 and was completed in the fall of 2009.
Baker College of Flint IT students, and reigning champions of the 2008 National Student Cyber Defense competition, defend their title and take first place to become the only back-to-back winners in the history of the event.
2010 - Baker College of Cadillac opens its new Center for Transportation and Technology.
2011 - The Culinary Institute of Michigan is granted Exemplary Status accreditation through the American Culinary Federation (ACF). The Baker College system celebrates its 100th anniversary.
2020- Baker relocated main campus from Flint, Michigan to Owosso, Michigan. In addition, the Clinton Township and Allen Park campuses were relocated to Auburn Hills, Michigan.

Campuses

Baker College has primarily grown through two methods: establishing new campuses and purchasing and rebranding existing small schools (for example, their Auburn Hills campus was once the Pontiac School of Business). They currently maintain fourteen ground campuses as well as an online college. Each campus is its own business entity, while an overarching Baker College Professional Services, Inc., coordinates campuses and services. Current campuses include:

 Owosso, Michigan
 Cadillac, Michigan
 Jackson, Michigan
 Muskegon, Michigan
 Auburn Hills, Michigan
 Royal Oak, Michigan
 Corporate Services
 Center for Graduate Studies
 Baker College Online
 The Culinary Institute of Michigan
 The Auto/Diesel Institute of Michigan

Academics

National Collegiate Cyber Defense Competition 
Baker College won the National Collegiate Cyber Defense Competition: 2008, 2009. Baker College won the Michigan Collegiate Cyber Defense Network state championships in: 2007, 2009, 2010, 2012, 2014, 2015, 2016, 2017, 2018., 2020, 2021, and 2022. They won the Michigan Collegiate Cyber Defense Network Cyber Wars championship: 2012. In 2019, Baker College was included in the Michigan Collegiate Cyber Defense Network Hall of Fame for being the only educational institution in the United States to win the national championship twice as well as for first and second place in multiple cyber defense competitions.

References

External links
Official website

Liberal arts colleges in Michigan
Private universities and colleges in the United States
Educational institutions established in 1911
Private universities and colleges in Michigan
1911 establishments in Michigan